Lithocarpus curtisii is a species of plant in the family Fagaceae. It is a tree found in Thailand and Peninsular Malaysia. It is threatened by habitat loss.

References

curtisii
Trees of Peninsular Malaysia
Trees of Thailand
Vulnerable plants
Taxonomy articles created by Polbot